Serbia competed at the 2012 Summer Paralympics in London, United Kingdom from August 29 to September 9, 2012.

Medalists

Athletics 

Men's Field Events

Women's Field Events

Cycling

Road

Men

Shooting

Table tennis 

Men's Singles

Women's Singles

Teams

See also

 Serbia at the 2012 Summer Olympics

References

Nations at the 2012 Summer Paralympics
2012
2012 in Serbian sport